Trigonopterus sampuragensis is a species of flightless weevil in the genus Trigonopterus from Indonesia.

Description
The species is endemic to Sulawesi in Indonesia. The species was described in May 2019.

References

sampuragensis
Beetles of Asia
Insects of Indonesia
Endemic fauna of Indonesia